Pemphigostola is a monotypic moth genus of the family Noctuidae. Its only species, Pemphigostola synemonistis, is found in Madagascar. Both the genus and species were first described by Strand in 1909.

References

Agaristinae
Moths of Madagascar
Monotypic moth genera